Ali Sleiman (born 28 March 1947) is a Lebanese épée and foil fencer. He competed in four events at the 1972 Summer Olympics.

References

External links
 

1947 births
Living people
Lebanese male épée fencers
Olympic fencers of Lebanon
Fencers at the 1972 Summer Olympics
Lebanese male foil fencers